Kothi may refer to:

Places
 Kothi, Hyderabad, Andhra Pradesh, India
 Kothi, Satna, Madhya Pradesh, India
 Kothi State, a former princely state in the modern Satna district, Madhya Pradesh

Other uses
 Kothi (gender), an effeminate man in the culture of the Indian subcontinent

See also

 Koti (disambiguation)